Columbus, Ohio is served by several newspapers, magazines, and television and radio stations.

Newspapers and magazines

Several weekly and daily newspapers serve Columbus and Central Ohio. The major daily newspaper in Columbus is The Columbus Dispatch; its erstwhile main competitor, The Columbus Citizen-Journal, ceased publication on December 31, 1985. There are also neighborhood/suburb specific papers, such as the Dispatch Printing Company's ThisWeek Community News, which serves 23 suburbs and Columbus, the Columbus Messenger, and the independently owned Short North Gazette. The Lantern and UWeekly serve the Ohio State University community. "Alternative" arts/culture/politics-oriented papers include Outlook Media's Outlook: Columbus (serving the city's LGBT community), and aLIVE (formerly the independent Columbus Alive and now owned by the Columbus Dispatch). The newest addition to the Columbus media scene is Live Local! Columbus, a free, quarterly magazine that focuses on local arts, culture, and events. 

The Columbus Magazine, CityScene, (614) Magazine, and Columbus Monthly are the city's magazines. Online media publication Columbus Underground also serves the Columbus region as an independently owned alternative voice. The Confluence Cast, a Columbus-centric podcast hosted by Tim Fulton, is presented by Columbus Underground and focuses on the civics, lifestyle, entertainment, and people of the city. 

The city's business community is served by The Daily Reporter, central Ohio's only printed daily business and legal newspaper; Columbus Business First, a daily online/weekly print business publication that is part of the Charlotte-based American City Business Journals, and Columbus CEO, a monthly business magazine. Gongwer News Service, a daily independent political newsletter, provides extensive Statehouse coverage.

Television
Columbus is the base for 12 television stations and is the 32nd largest television market as of September 24, 2016.

 WCMH-TV 4 (NBC)
 WDEM-CD 17 (TMD)
 WOSU-TV 34 (PBS)

 WSYX 6 (ABC)
 WQMC-LD 23 (Ind)
 WCPX-LD 48 (MXC)

 WGCT-CD 8 (Ind)
 WTTE 28 (TBD)
 WSFJ-TV 51 (Bounce TV)

 WBNS-TV 10 (CBS)
 WCSN-LD 33 (multiple networks)
 WWHO 53 (CW)

Warner Cable introduced its two-way interactive QUBE system in Columbus in December 1977, which consisted of specialty channels that would evolve into national networks Nickelodeon, MTV and The Movie Channel. QUBE also displayed one of the earliest uses of Pay-per-view and video on demand.

Radio
Columbus is home to the 36th largest radio market. The following box contains all of the radio stations in the area, as well as their current format:

References

 
Columbus